Lance is an unincorporated community in Madison County, in the U.S. state of Missouri.

History
A post office called Lance was established in 1894, and remained in operation until 1906. The community has the name of Daniel Jefferson Lance, an early settler.

References

Unincorporated communities in Madison County, Missouri
Unincorporated communities in Missouri